Michael Schenker (born 10 January 1955)  is a German guitarist. He played in the rock band UFO and leads the Michael Schenker Group. He was an early member of the hard rock band Scorpions, a band co-founded by his elder brother Rudolf Schenker. In the mid-1970s, Schenker joined UFO, playing lead and rhythm guitar. He left the band in 1978 to found the Michael Schenker Group. He has rejoined UFO three times, producing an album each time. Schenker continues to perform and record. He has been called "a legendary figure in the history of metal guitar."

Career

Early career and rise to fame: Scorpions and UFO 

Schenker started playing guitar at an early age, after his brother Rudolf got a Gibson Flying V guitar for his birthday, which captured his imagination. His main influences were Jimmy Page, Jeff Beck, Eric Clapton, Leslie West, Johnny Winter and Rory Gallagher. He played his first gig when he was 11, with Rudolf and the Scorpions in a nightclub. Schenker debuted with Scorpions on their debut Lonesome Crow at 16.

After recording their first album, the Scorpions opened for up-and-coming UK band UFO in Germany. Schenker was invited to be lead guitarist for UFO (taking over from Bernie Marsden, himself a temporary replacement for Mick Bolton). With Rudolf's blessing, Schenker accepted. (The Scorpions replaced him with Uli Roth.)

Schenker cowrote most of the songs on UFO's major label (Chrysalis Records) debut Phenomenon. His career with UFO was turbulent, sometimes walking off mid-song and causing shows to be cancelled. Despite successful albums and tours, Schenker unequivocally quit UFO after their show in Palo Alto, California, on 29 October 1978. During this tour the band had recorded six concerts, from which selected tracks would make up their live album Strangers in the Night, released after he left the band. "[Singer Phil] Mogg later claimed that I left UFO over a disagreement about which version of 'Rock Bottom' appeared on Strangers," Schenker recalled, "but don't believe everything you read."

Schenker briefly rejoined Scorpions in late 1978, when they were recording Lovedrive. He composed and played lead guitar on "Another Piece of Meat", "Coast To Coast" and "Lovedrive". Although it was believed for decades that those three were Schenker's only contributions to the record, during an interview with satellite radio host Eddie Trunk, Schenker vehemently maintained that he contributed to the whole album. In 1979, Schenker briefly toured with the band in support of the album. He blamed his very short stay on finding out he did not enjoy playing other people's songs. He was permanently replaced by Matthias Jabs, who had originally joined Scorpions before Schenker's return.

Schenker auditioned for Aerosmith in 1979 after Joe Perry left. According to Martin Huxley, Schenker stormed out of the room after producer Gary Lyons made jokes about Nazis. After the death of Randy Rhoads, Ozzy Osbourne's first call was to Schenker to replace Rhoads, as the German guitarist and his iconic Flying V were a huge influence on the latter. But, Osbourne claims, Schenker made too many outlandish demands (including a private jet). Schenker himself, in an interview with KNAC radio, claims he was the one to say "no" to Osbourne: "If I would have joined Ozzy Osbourne, I would have screwed up my life. I was almost about to do it, and something told me: DON'T!!" Schenker has also claimed that at some point he was offered, but turned down joining the likes of Deep Purple, Thin Lizzy, Ian Hunter and Motörhead in order to focus on his solo career.

Michael Schenker Group, McAuley Schenker Group and UFO Reunion 

In 1979, Schenker started a solo career by founding the Michael Schenker Group (MSG). The history of MSG is strewn with personality conflicts and incidents. In 1982, original singer Gary Barden, who sang on the first two studio albums and a live album, was fired in favour of Graham Bonnet. Bonnet lasted one album (Assault Attack) and a single gig, at Sheffield University, where he drunkenly exposed himself and was subsequently fired from the band. Barden rejoined MSG for the rest of the tour. He also appeared on the 1983 studio album (Built to Destroy) and the band's second live album (Rock Will Never Die).

After Barden's second departure, Schenker reorganized the band around himself and new singer Robin McAuley and renamed it the McAuley Schenker Group. The new incarnation of MSG was steered toward a more commercial hard rock sound. After three albums, Schenker and McAuley parted company. In the meantime, he briefly replaced Robbin Crosby in Ratt, appearing on their 1990 MTV Unplugged performance.

In 1993, Schenker rejoined UFO. He co-wrote (with Phil Mogg) nearly the whole of their reunion album, Walk on Water (1995), and toured with them briefly.

He then resurrected the Michael Schenker Group with all new members and recorded three more albums, Written in the Sand, The Unforgiven, and Be Aware of Scorpions before rejoining UFO for two further releases, Covenant and Sharks.

2000–present 

Schenker fell on hard times in the early 2000s, despite his rejoining UFO that year. He later recorded the album Arachnophobiac and supported it with two years of touring. In 2004, recognition came from Dean Guitars, which began producing a Schenker signature Dean V (with subtle differences from the Gibson, but with the split black and white trademark Schenker finish).

2005 was the 25th anniversary of the Michael Schenker Group. Schenker put together a new album of songs called Tales of Rock'n'Roll to celebrate the anniversary and enlisted singers from each iteration of the band to sing on the album. However, in that same year the collection Heavy Hitters, a set of covers featuring Schenker and a revolving group of heavy metal all-stars, was marketed as a Michael Schenker Group album, with the result that Schenker only received a flat fee.

After nearly-disastrous North American and European tours in 2007, which included cancelled shows and less-than-stellar performances caused by heavy drinking, Schenker regained his composure and toured in the UK as Michael Schenker & Friends in 2008. Early 2008, Schenker worked with Gary Barden, Don Airey, Simon Phillips, and Neil Murray on a new MSG album In the Midst of Beauty, which was released in May 2008, followed by touring.

In 2009 Schenker toured extensively including Russia, UK and the US with MSG including original members Gary Barden and Chris Glenn.

In November 2010, Schenker was given the Marshall "11" award in London along with other rock legends including Ron Wood and Slash. The award was presented to Schenker by Alice Cooper, with Jimmy Page, Tony Iommi and John Paul Jones also in attendance. The award is given to "those artists and musicians who represent rock 'n' roll excess and livin' on the edge."

In 2011 Schenker released a new album, Temple of Rock. It was supported with a tour of Europe, Japan and the USA. In Europe the line up included Herman Rarebell on drums and Francis Buchholz on bass, both former members of Scorpions (Rarebell also joined the band for the Japanese dates) and Doogie White, formerly singer for Rainbow and Yngwie Malmsteen. With this line-up he recorded the album Bridge the Gap which was released in 2013.

In August 2012 Schenker received a Lifetime Achievement in Rock and Roll Award from Vegas Rocks! Magazine. The award was presented by David Coverdale of Whitesnake. During the award ceremony Schenker performed with Sammy Hagar of Chickenfoot, Montrose and Van Halen.

Instruments and sound 

Schenker's main guitar for most of his career was a Gibson Flying V, which he typically played through a "cocked" wah-wah pedal (switched on but left in a single position, around halfway through the travel of the foot pedal, and used as an equaliser to strengthen the midrange "sweet spot") and Marshall amplifiers. Schenker's "unmistakable midrange tone" was emphasised by the partially engaged wah pedal, as exemplified on the song "Rock Bottom" from the live UFO album Strangers in the Night, was listed among the 50 greatest tones of all time by Guitar Player magazine. Since 2004, Schenker has switched to using a signature model Dean V.

In 2007 Dean Guitars, after producing Schenker's signature Dean V, also made two acoustic models with the familiar black and white "V" design.

Awards and recognition 
 Placed on Guitar World magazine's 100 Greatest Heavy Metal Guitarists.
In 2010 Schenker was given the Marshall "11" award.
Schenker accepted his "Rock Guitar Legend" award at the Vegas Rocks! Magazine Music Awards 2012.
On 16 June 2014, Schenker was honored the Golden God Icon Award at the Metal Hammer Golden God Awards at the IndiO2 in London.

Influence 
Schenker has been on the covers of many guitar magazines and has influenced many notable guitar players, including Kirk Hammett and James Hetfield (Metallica), Dave Mustaine and Marty Friedman (Megadeth), Dimebag Darrell (Pantera), Alex Skolnick and Eric Peterson (Testament), Mike McCready (Pearl Jam), Gary Holt (Exodus), Rob Cavestany (Death Angel), Adrian Smith (Iron Maiden), Slash, John Norum (Europe), Paul Gilbert, Randy Rhoads, George Lynch (Dokken), Warren DeMartini (Ratt), John Petrucci (Dream Theater), Michael Amott  (Arch Enemy), Dan Spitz (Anthrax), Criss Oliva (Savatage), Jeff Waters (Annihilator), Phil Campbell (Motörhead), Kerry King (Slayer), and Syu (Galneryus).

Michael Schenker Group band members 

Current members
Michael Schenker – lead and rhythm guitars, occasional backing vocals 
Bodo Schopf – drums 
Steve Mann – rhythm guitar, keyboards, backing vocals 
Ronnie Romero – lead vocals 
Barend Courbois – bass, backing vocals

Discography

Other Schenker projects 
Look at Me Now (Bernie Marsden Album) (1981) as guest
Legends of Rock at Castle Donington (2001, Live)
Siggi Schwarz & The Electric Guitar Legends (2004)
Siggi Schwarz & The Rock Legends (2005)
Heavy Metal Thunder (2005)
Numbers from the Beast (2005)
Agony & The Xtasy (Gary Barden Solo Album) (2006)
Siggi Schwarz and Michael Schenker – Live Together (2006, Live)
Metal X-Mas (two-CD Special Edition) (2010)
Strangers in the Night (2010)
Seeking Major Tom (2011)

Compilations 
 The Essential Michael Schenker Group (Best Of-style compilation, 1992)
 The Story of Michael Schenker (1994, Compilation)
  Armed & ready – the best of the Michael Schenker Group  (1994, Music Collection International)
 The Michael Schenker Story Live (1994):  see also The Michael Schenker Story Live, the audio recording.
 Forever And More: The Best of Michael Schenker (2003)
 Greatest Riffs (2009, US-only compilation)
 Instrumental Intensity (2010, Shrapnel Records compilation)

References

External links 

 
 
 2015 Michael Schenker Interview on Guitar.com

1955 births
Living people
People from Sarstedt
German Christians
German rock guitarists
German male guitarists
German heavy metal guitarists
Lead guitarists
Slide guitarists
Scorpions (band) members
UFO (band) members
Michael Schenker Group members
McAuley Schenker Group members
Ratt members
G3 (tour)
Contraband (band) members